Monica Bachmann-Weier (born 17 April 1942) is a retired Swiss horse rider. She competed in the individual and team show jumping at the 1968 and 1972 Summer Olympics and placed fifth-seventh. Her husband Paul Weier is also an Olympic show jumper.

References

1942 births
Living people
Olympic equestrians of Switzerland
Equestrians at the 1968 Summer Olympics
Equestrians at the 1972 Summer Olympics
Swiss female equestrians
Sportspeople from St. Gallen (city)